The McMurray–Frizzell–Aldridge Farm is a historic home and farm complex located at Westminster, Carroll County, Maryland, United States. It consists of a log house constructed about 1790 and later enlarged, and several 19th and early 20th century domestic and agricultural outbuildings, including a stone summer kitchen, a frame smokehouse, a frame bank barn, a frame wagon shed, a frame hog pen, and a stone spring house.

The McMurray–Frizzell–Aldridge Farm was listed on the National Register of Historic Places in 2001.

References

External links
, including photo from 2000, at Maryland Historical Trust

Farms on the National Register of Historic Places in Maryland
Houses in Carroll County, Maryland
Houses completed in 1790
Westminster, Maryland
National Register of Historic Places in Carroll County, Maryland